Mir Mohammed Helal Uddin (born 12 August) is a Bangladeshi barrister and Bangladesh Nationalist Party politician. He hails from a renowned family of Mir Bari, Mirer Khil Mirer Haat, Hathazari, Chittagong, Bangladesh. He is serving as a member of the National Executive Committee of the Bangladesh Nationalist Party (BNP). He is also serving as a member of the Foreign Relations Committee of the BNP.

Early life and education 
Mir Helal is the only son of late Dalia Nazneen Nasir and Advocate Mir Mohammed Nasiruddin. His father  is a veteran politician and an advocate of the appellate division of the Supreme Court of Bangladesh. He was one of the founder leaders of Bangladesh Nationalist Party (BNP) in Chittagong.

Mir Mohammed Nasiruddin was the founder Convenor of Bangladesh Nationalist Party (BNP), Hathazari Unit. He subsequently served the party as the elected president of Bangladesh Nationalist Party (BNP) Chittagong North District, as the elected president of Bangladesh Nationalist Party (BNP) Chittagong City Unit. He also served the party as an International Affairs Secretary of the National Executive Committee of Bangladesh Nationalist Party (BNP), Advisor to the chairperson of Bangladesh Nationalist Party (BNP) former Prime Minister of Bangladesh Begum Khaleda Zia. At present he is serving as the vice chairman of the BNP. As a statesman Mr. Mir Mohammed Nasiruddin served the country as the Mayor of Chittagong City Corporation, Chairman of Janata Bank, Board of Directors, Ambassador of Bangladesh to the Kingdom of Saudi Arabia and lastly as the State Minister in charge of the Ministry of Civil Aviation and Tourism of the Government of the Peoples Republic of Bangladesh.

Mir Helal's late mother Dalia Nazneen Nasir also hails from a very well known, respectable and prominent “Dovash” family of Chittagong. She graduated and completed her master's degree from Chittagong University in sociology and later pursued a law degree.

By profession an advocate of the Supreme Court of Bangladesh, a UK trained barrister-at-law, member of the Honourable Society of Lincoln’s Inn, UK.

Career
Mir Helal is serving as a member of the National Executive Committee of the BNP. He is also serving as a member of the Foreign Relations Committee of the BNP. He is a member of the Central Convening Committee of Bangladesh Nationalist Lawyers Forum. Mir Helal is involved in many social activities and is the vice chairman of the Board of Trustees of his family’s charitable trust “Dalia-Nusrat Memorial Trust”. Through these trust various charitable works are carried out in Hathazari and as well as others parts of Chittagong. Dalia-Nusrat Memorial Trust built many religious establishments and independently runs an Islamic education centre known as the Amatunnoor Taalimul Quran Nurani Madrasha and Hefjokhana. Mir Helal is the president of the Management Committee of Mir Nowabul Hoque Memorial High School, Mirekhil, Hathazari, Chittagong and contributing towards providing education to the people of his area.

Mir Helal has also been involved with a policy institute called the “Centre for Nationalism Studies" (CNS) as Treasure of the Board of Trustees. He is serving as a member of the panel of Editors of a monthly literary magazine “Srijon”. He is also affiliated with many professional and social organisations and clubs namely the Bangladesh Supreme Court Bar Association, Dhaka Bar Association, Chittagong Bar Association, Gulshan Society, Chittagong Club Ltd, Baridhara Cosmopoliton Club Ltd and Gulshan Youth Club Ltd.

References

Living people
1982 births
People from Chittagong
Bangladeshi barristers
Bangladesh Nationalist Party politicians
Bangladeshi criminals
Place of birth missing (living people)